Karatobe (Qaratöbe; Russian: Каратобе) is a village in north-western Kazakhstan. It is the administrative center of Karatobe District in West Kazakhstan Region. Population:

References

Populated places in West Kazakhstan Region